Gramella portivictoriae is a Gram-negative, strictly aerobic and rod-shaped bacterium from the genus of Gramella which has been isolated from marine sediments.

References

Flavobacteria
Bacteria described in 2005